Dr. Roberto M. Rosende is an American philatelist who was added to the Roll of Distinguished Philatelists in 1985.

Rosende is an expert in the philately of Cuba.

References

Signatories to the Roll of Distinguished Philatelists
American philatelists
Year of birth missing (living people)
Living people